Alexander Vladimirovich Yeryomenko (born 10 April 1980) is a Russian former professional ice hockey goaltender who most notably played for Dynamo Moscow in the Kontinental Hockey League (KHL).

Playing career
Alexander Eremenko started his pro career in 1999 with the Russian hockey team THK Tver. He played from 2001 to 2005 for the HC Dynamo Moscow in the RSL. At the end of the 04/05 season he became Russian champion with Dynamo Moscow, before he signed a 2-year contract with Ak Bars Kazan. He was also selected as a reserve by Team Russia for the 2010 Winter Olympics should an injury occur during the tournament.

He played for Salavat Yulaev Ufa of the KHL before returning to Dynamo Moscow for the 2011–12 season.

On 23 March 2022, following the conclusion of the 2021–22 season, Yeryomenko announced his retirement after 22 years in the top flight Russian leagues.

Career statistics

Regular season and playoffs

International

Honours
Russian Championship (Before 2009):  2005, 2006, 2008
Gagarin Cup Winner (Since 2009):  2011, 2012, 2013
Russian Super League runner up:  2007
Euro Hockey Tour:  2005, 2006, 2007, 2008
Ceska Pojistovna Cup:  2006, 2008
Channel One Cup:  2006, 2008
European Champions Cup:  2006, 2007
World Champion:  2008, 2009
KHL All-Star Game:  2009
Gagarin Cup MVP:  2012, 2013

References

External links

1980 births
Living people
Ak Bars Kazan players
Amur Khabarovsk players
HC Dynamo Moscow players
HC Mechel players
Ice hockey players at the 2014 Winter Olympics
Olympic ice hockey players of Russia
Russian ice hockey goaltenders
Russian people of Ukrainian descent
Salavat Yulaev Ufa players
Ice hockey people from Moscow